Hydes Lake is a lake in Carver County, Minnesota, in the United States.

Hydes Lake was named for Ernst Heyd, a government surveyor who owned land near this lake.

References

Lakes of Minnesota
Lakes of Carver County, Minnesota